Karvia is a municipality of Finland founded in 1865.

It is located in the province of Western Finland and is part of the Satakunta region.

Twin town of Karvia is Viru-Nigula in Estonia since 1994.

References

External links

 Official homepages of Karvia 
 Travelling in Karvia 

Municipalities of Satakunta
Populated places established in 1865